Alexander Harvey may refer to:

Alexander Harvey II (1923–2017), US federal judge
Alexander Gordon Cummins Harvey, British cotton manufacturer and merchant
Alexander Miller Harvey (1867–1928), Kansas lawyer, politician, and author
Alex Harvey (country musician) — (1941-2020), hit songwriter

See also
Alex Harvey (disambiguation)
William Alexander Harvey (1874–1951), English architect